Rafael Quiñones Vidal (November 13, 1892 in Mayagüez, Puerto Rico – March 7, 1988) was a journalist and a radio and television Master of Ceremonies.

He studied at the Lincoln School in Caguas, Puerto Rico until eighth grade.  He pursued a career as a graduate teacher, taking private lessons with Ana Roque de Duprey, in Humacao.  For four years he worked as a rural teacher. He had an accounting school in Caguas.  He obtained the title of Venerable Master of the Masonic Lodge "Union and Amparo" of Caguas, and was named Doctor Honoris Causa in Humanities of the Catholic University of Ponce.  He founded a chapter of the Masonic Lodge of the Order "Star of the East, Union and Faith".

Quiñones Vidal is acknowledged as the first Puerto Rican communicator to promote young singers through his radio and television singing competition show called, Tribuna del Arte (The Art Rostrum).

Well known singers and performers from Puerto Rico who started as artists in this show include Yolandita Monge, Lucecita Benítez and Carmen Delia Dipini.

See also

List of Puerto Rico TV presenters

References 

1892 births
1988 deaths
People from Mayagüez, Puerto Rico
Television pioneers
Puerto Rican television journalists
20th-century American philanthropists